Syed Mohsin Raza Naqvi (born 28 October 1978) is a Pakistani media mogul who is the owner of City Media Group. He is serving as the incumbent caretaker Chief Minister of Punjab since 22 January 2023.

Early life and Media Career
Naqvi was born on October 28, 1978 in the city of Lahore, of the Punjab province and did his primary education at Crescent Model School in Lahore.

He graduated from  Government College University (GCU) Lahore and moved the United States for further studies in media sciences.

He reportedly stayed in coastal metropolis city of Miami, joined the multinational cable news CNN as a correspondent, and became the youngest Regional Head of South Asia after returning to Pakistan.

He later founded City Media Group in 2009 with C42 as its first television channel which was later re-branded as City 42. Currently he is running six TV Channels and one newspaper; including 24 News Channel, Rohi Channel for Sairiki Belt and popular channel of Faisalabad city C41. He has also started Channel 21 from Karachi. His Urdu News Channel C44 is also working in UK.

Chief Minister of Punjab

Naqvi was one of the two nominees suggested by Hamza Shehbaz, Leader of the opposition Punjab Assembly.  The appointment of Naqvi as caretaker CM was later made by Election Commission of Pakistan during a meeting chaired by Chief Election Commissioner, Sikander Sultan Raja after having an unusual delay and constant deadlock between the previous provincial government and the opposition over the nominees after the dissolution of the Punjab Assembly. On 31st Jan, 2023, Mohsin Naqvi retained a Rolex Watch from Toshakhana, however, the market value and the price paid for the watch were not disclosed.

References

Living people
Chief Ministers of Punjab, Pakistan
1978 births
People from Lahore
Government College University, Lahore alumni